

Walther Hahm (21 December 1894 – 11 August 1951) was a German general during World War II who held several commands at division and corps level. He was a recipient of the  Knight's Cross of the Iron Cross with Oak Leaves of Nazi Germany.

Awards and decorations
 Iron Cross (1914) 2nd Class (3 December 1914) & 1st Class (4 September 1917)
 Clasp to the Iron Cross (1939) 2nd Class (27 May 1940) & 1st Class (12 June 1940)
 Knight's Cross of the Iron Cross with Oak Leaves
 Knight's Cross on 15 November 1941 as Oberst and commander of Infanterie-Regiment 480
 676th Oak Leaves on 9 December 1944 as Generalleutnant and commander of 389.Infanterie-Division

References

Citations

Bibliography

 
 

1894 births
1951 deaths
People from Milicz
People from the Province of Silesia
German Army generals of World War II
Generals of Infantry (Wehrmacht)
German Army personnel of World War I
Reichswehr personnel
German prisoners of war in World War II
Recipients of the clasp to the Iron Cross, 1st class
Recipients of the Knight's Cross of the Iron Cross with Oak Leaves